Human Capital is the bi-monthly human resources publication of the Singapore Human Resources Institute (SHRI) with readership pool of over 36,000 Singaporean and international HR readers. The magazine is released by People Trends Pte Ltd.

References

External links
 Official Website
 SHRI Website
 People Trends website

2001 establishments in Singapore
Bi-monthly magazines
Human resource management publications
Magazines established in 2001
Magazines published in Singapore
Professional and trade magazines